Melogora is a rural locality (a village) in Mezensky District, Arkhangelsk Oblast, Russia. The population was 53 as of 2012.

Geography 
Melogora is located on the Mezen River, 84 km south of Mezen (the district's administrative centre) by road. Tselegora is the nearest rural locality.

References 

Rural localities in Mezensky District